Maurice Robert Hely-Hutchinson   (22 May 1887 – 11 February 1961) was a Conservative Party politician in England.

He was elected as Member of Parliament (MP) for Hastings in East Sussex at a by-election in 1937. He held the seat until the 1945 general election, when he stood down from Parliament. During The Great Depression Hely-Hutchinson caused some controversy when he remarked that the long-term unemployed should lose the right to vote.

His parents were Sir Walter Hely-Hutchinson, Governor of the Cape Colony, and May Hely-Hutchinson.

He was married to Melita Keppel, daughter of Admiral Sir Colin Richard Keppel.

References

External links 
 

Conservative Party (UK) MPs for English constituencies
UK MPs 1935–1945
1887 births
1961 deaths
Recipients of the Military Cross